Once at Midnight is a 1929 German silent comedy film directed by Karl Otto Krause and starring Betty Astor, Alfons Fryland, and Kurt Middendorf.

Cast
 Betty Astor as Blondine
 Alfons Fryland as Automechaniker und Tenor
 Kurt Middendorf as Impresssario
 Hertha von Walther as Kammersängerin

References

Bibliography
 Gerhard Lamprecht. Deutsche Stummfilme: 1927–1931.

External links

1929 films
Films of the Weimar Republic
German silent feature films
Films directed by Karl Otto Krause
German black-and-white films
German comedy films
1929 comedy films
Silent comedy films
1920s German films